Richard Dyer-Bennet (6 October 1913 in Leicester, England – 14 December 1991 in Monterey, Massachusetts) was an English-born American folk singer (or his own preferred term, "minstrel"), recording artist, and voice teacher.

Biography
He was born on 6 October 1913 in Leicester, England, to Richard Stewart Dyer-Bennet (1886–1983) and Miriam Wolcott Clapp.

Dyer-Bennet studied voice with Gertrude Wheeler Beckman and Sven Scholander. His first album released included the song, The Lonesome Valley, used for many years to sign off the Midnight Special on WFMT each Saturday night. A favorite interview of Studs Terkel.

He had a stroke in 1972 paralyzing his left side and he stopped giving concerts.

He was heir presumptive of the Dyer baronets from 1983 until his death.

He died on 14 December 1991 at his home in Monterey, Massachusetts.

Legacy
During his peak performance years, he gave 50 concerts a year. He recorded extensively for many labels, and eventually founded his own, Dyer-Bennet Records, and recorded in his own living room. The albums he recorded on his own label have been re-released on CD by Smithsonian Folkways. The CD Richard Dyer-Bennet 1 includes a biographical essay written by Dyer-Bennet's daughter, Bonnie, which highlights his progressive politics and his battle with a debilitating stroke in later life (he taught himself to play harp one-handed so that he could continue to perform and teach). A biography – Richard Dyer-Bennet: The Last Minstrel – by Paul O Jenkins was published in December 2009 by the University Press of Mississippi.  The book chronicles Dyer-Bennet's eventful life and includes a foreword by his daughter.

Discography
Dyer-Bennet Records releases
 1949: Richard Dyer-Bennet: Twentieth Century Minstrel (Decca DLP 5046)
 1952: Folk Songs (Remington REP-1)" 
 1955: Richard Dyer-Bennet 1 
 1956: Richard Dyer-Bennet 2 
 1956: Richard Dyer-Bennet 3 
 1957: Richard Dyer-Bennet 4 
 1958: Richard Dyer-Bennet 5: Requests 
 1958: Richard Dyer-Bennet 6: Songs With Young People in Mind 
 1958: Richard Dyer-Bennet 7: Beethoven Scottish and Irish Songs 
 1959: Richard Dyer-Bennet 8: Gems of Minstrelsy 
 1960: Richard Dyer-Bennet 9 
 1962: Mark Twain's 1601 
 1962: A Richard Dyer-Bennet Concert (Stinson Records)
 1962: Richard Dyer-Bennet 10 
 1962: Richard Dyer-Bennet 11: Stephen Foster Songs 
 1964: Richard Dyer-Bennet 12: Songs of Ships, Seafaring Men, Watery Graves...and One Edible Rat 
 1964: Richard Dyer-Bennet 13: Stories and Songs for Children and Their Parents 
Folkways Records releases
 1967: The Asch Recordings, 1939 to 1945 – Vol. 2 (Folkways Records)
 All the Dyer-Bennet Records releases have been re-released by Smithsonian Folkways.

Bibliography
1970: The Richard Dyer-Bennet Folk Song Book. New York: Simon and Schuster.

Videography
1980:

References

External links 
"Richard Dyer-Bennet Resource Page"
Dyer Bennet at Smithsonian Folkways

1913 births
1991 deaths
American folk singers
20th-century American singers
Musicians from Leicestershire
People from Leicester
People from Berkshire County, Massachusetts
British emigrants to the United States